Dom Sheed (born 10 April 1995) is an Australian rules footballer, playing for the West Coast Eagles in the Australian Football League (AFL).

Early life
A midfielder, he made his senior debut for Subiaco in round 21 of the 2012 season, aged , having been a regular in the colts team before then. Sheed was part of the 2012–13 intake into the AIS–AFL Academy, part of the Australian Institute of Sport, and toured Europe with the squad in 2013. As well as playing four further senior matches for Subiaco during the 2013 season, Sheed also captained Western Australia at the AFL Under 18 Championships, winning the Larke Medal as the best player at the tournament. He had averaged 28 disposals across his four games at the tournament, and kicked four goals against Victoria Country, despite breaking his collarbone late in the match.

West Coast

Sheed was drafted by West Coast with pick 11 in the 2013 national draft. The club was able to select him despite "downgrading" from pick six to pick eleven as part of a trade with Brisbane to secure Elliot Yeo. After strong form in the pre-season, Sheed was selected to make his senior AFL debut in round one of the 2014 season. He played as the substitute, and recorded three disposals after replacing Luke Shuey at three-quarter time. He was dropped from the team the following round to get more game time, instead playing for West Coast's WAFL affiliate, . Sheed played ten games for West Coast in his debut season, including six consecutive games late in the season, from rounds 17 to 22. He also played for East Perth in the 2014 WAFL finals series.

After playing 18 matches throughout the 2018 season, Sheed rose to fame after taking a mark towards the end of the Grand Final, and kicking the goal that resulted in the Eagles taking the lead with minimal time left to play. The Eagles clung on to win the match by five points, resulting in the club winning their fourth premiership.

Statistics
Statistics are correct to the end of round 8, 2022

|- style="background-color: #EAEAEA"
! scope="row" style="text-align:center" | 2014
|style="text-align:center;"|
| 4 || 10 || 1 || 3 || 51 || 56 || 107 || 17 || 27 || 0.1 || 0.3 || 5.1 || 5.6 || 10.7 || 1.7 || 2.7
|-
! scope="row" style="text-align:center" | 2015
|style="text-align:center;"|
| 4 || 23 || 10 || 11 || 229 || 220 || 449 || 70 || 52 || 0.4 || 0.5 || 10.0 || 9.6 || 19.5 || 3.0 || 2.3
|- style="background:#eaeaea;"
! scope="row" style="text-align:center" | 2016
|style="text-align:center;"|
| 4 || 6 || 1 || 2 || 51 || 43 || 94 || 17 || 11 || 0.2 || 0.3 || 8.5 || 7.2 || 15.7 || 2.8 || 1.8
|-
! scope="row" style="text-align:center" | 2017
|style="text-align:center;"|
| 4 || 21 || 11 || 13 || 272 || 196 || 468 || 104 || 53 || 0.5 || 0.6 || 13.0 || 9.3 || 22.3 || 5.0 || 2.5
|- style="background:#eaeaea;"
| scope=row bgcolor=F0E68C | 2018# || 
| 4 || 18 || 8 || 7 || 231 || 182 || 413 || 72 || 33 || 0.4 || 0.4 || 12.8 || 10.1 || 22.9 || 4.0 || 1.8
|-
! scope="row" style="text-align:center" | 2019
|style="text-align:center;"|
| 4 || 24 || 16 || 15 || 344 || 291 || 635 || 128 || 39 || 0.7 || 0.6 || 14.3 || 12.1 || 26.5 || 5.3 || 1.6
|- style="background:#eaeaea;"
|style="text-align:center"|2020
|style="text-align:center;"|
| 4 || 17 || 8 || 3 || 172 || 164 || 336 || 55 || 40 || 0.5 || 0.2 || 10.1 || 9.6 || 19.8 || 3.2 || 2.4
|-
! scope="row" style="text-align:center" | 2021
|style="text-align:center;"|
| 4 || 22 || 9 || 6 || 320 || 259 || 579 || 108 || 51 || 0.4 || 0.3 || 14.5 || 11.8 || 26.3 || 4.9 || 2.3
|- style="background:#eaeaea;"
|style="text-align:center"|2022
|style="text-align:center;"|
| 4 || 0 || – || – || – || – || – || – || – || – || – || – || – || – || – || –
|- class="sortbottom"
! colspan=3| Career
! 141 !! 64 !! 60 !! 1670 !! 1411 !! 3081 !! 571 !! 306 !! 0.5 !! 0.4 !! 11.8 !! 10.0 !! 21.9 !! 4.0 !! 2.2
|}

Notes

References

External links

WAFL playing statistics

1995 births
Australian rules footballers from Western Australia
East Perth Football Club players
Mines Rovers Football Club players
Living people
People from Kalgoorlie
Subiaco Football Club players
West Coast Eagles players
West Coast Eagles Premiership players
One-time VFL/AFL Premiership players